Derb-e Miyan Ab (also Romanized as Derb-e Mīyān Āb; also known as Derb-e Mīyāb) is a village in Rak Rural District, in the Central District of Kohgiluyeh County, Kohgiluyeh and Boyer-Ahmad Province, Iran. At the 2006 census, its population was 46, in 8 families.

References 

Populated places in Kohgiluyeh County